The World Polo Championship is a polo (Horse Polo) competition between countries (Up to 2022, only for men). The event is organised by the sport's governing body, the Federation of International Polo (FIP), and is contested by the national teams. There is no restriction on the gender of the players. The inaugural tournament was held in 1987, hosted by Argentina, and is now contested every three or four years.

The participating teams must have a handicap up to 14 goals. It's for this reason that, unlike other sports, the best players cannot play the World Polo Championship.

History 
In the early 1980s, motivated by a desire to broaden the scope of international polo, as well as to restore the sport's Olympic status, Marcos Uranga, then President of the Argentine Polo Association, proposed that an international organization be formed among the polo playing countries of the world. The initial meetings took place in Buenos Aires, and by April 1982, the Federation of International Polo, quickly known as “FIP,” was created. FIP's first President was Marcos Uranga.

To that end, Mr. Uranga spearheaded the movement for a World Championship and scheduled the first for April 1987 in the Campo Argentino de Polo in Buenos Aires, Argentina. Aware of the relative difficulty of fielding high-goal teams worldwide, the early FIP organizers wisely decided to limit competition to teams rated 10 to 14 goals. And, in an attempt to nullify the factor of the horses, they devised the then-revolutionary idea of split strings of horses – assigning matched strings of 28 horses to each team by the luck of the draw.

In 1989, the second FIP World Championship was played in Berlin, at Maifeld, the very stadium that had been the site of polo's last appearance in the Olympic Games. The sport had come full-circle, and it underlined the growing influence of FIP in the world polo community. Argentina, Australia, Chile, England, France, Germany, Switzerland and the United States advanced to the playoffs. But this time there was a surprise: Argentina failed to make the finals. A talented U.S. team beat England by one goal for a 7–6 final score. The U.S. team players were: Horton Schwartz, Julio Arellano, Charley Bostwick and John Wigdahl who scored the winning goal in the sixth chukker. The resulting publicity raised the visibility of FIP among U.S. polo players.

FIP World Championship III was played in Santiago, Chile, in 1992. Argentina made it “back to back” through the regionals, and knocked off team after team until they wound up in the finals. There they outscored the host country 12–7 for their second World Championship. The U.S. had to be content with fourth place behind England.

In 1995, the fourth World Championship was held in Saint Moritz, Switzerland. Brazil fought its way gamely through the early rounds to meet Argentina in the final. Now it was Brazil's turn for triumph. They pulled out an exciting win 11–10 to assume the mantle of World Polo Champions.

Since 1993 Michael Schultz-Tholen, then the FIP delegate to the International Olympic Committee, arranged numerous meetings with IOC representatives including the President of the International Olympic Committee Mr. Juan Antonio Samaranch. Finally at the 1996 Atlanta Olympic Games, the General Assembly of the International Olympic Committee granted the status of an IOC Recognized Sport and accepted the Federation of International Polo as the worldwide governing body for the sport of polo. This decision was confirmed ("outright recognition") two years later.

In 1998, the fifth World Championship was held at the Santa Barbara Polo & Racquet Club in Santa Barbara, California. Mr. James Easton, a Member of the International Olympic Committee, presented Argentina, the winning team, with a history-making Olympic trophy. This was the first time in 62 years that the winning team of an international polo tournament was so honored.

The FIP World Championship VI held in Melbourne, Australia in 2001 featured eight national teams that qualified through a demanding and highly competitive zone playoff system, which included 24 country teams participating worldwide.   Brazil narrowly defeated Australia by one goal (Brazil 10, Australia 9) in an exciting tournament that any of the eight finalists could have won.

In 2004, the Sixth World Championship was held in Chantilly, France. The tournament included eight teams. The qualifying rounds included 28 countries competing. All the games were very competitive. Brazil was not ready to give the title and defeated England in the final game (10 -9) in sudden death.

The eighth edition of the World Polo Championship took place in Mexico during May 2008 and was won by Chile.

The ninth edition of the World Polo Championship took place in San Luis Province, Argentina during October 2011 and was won by Argentina. Brazil being second, and Italy took the third place after defeating England. It was the first time in World Polo Championship for Italy to achieve a podium.

The tenth edition of the World Polo Championship took place in Santiago, Chile during march and April 2015 and was won by the host, beating the United States in the final.

Championships

Medals (1987–2022)

Ranking

Nations

See also 
 Federation of International Polo
 Polo handicap
 Polo at the Summer Olympics
 Polo at the Pan American Games
 Polo at the 2007 Southeast Asian Games
 Polo at the 2017 Southeast Asian Games
 Polo at the 2019 Southeast Asian Games
 PIPA Snow Polo World Cup Tour
 PIPA Beach Polo World Series
 Ezra Cup
 Mannheim May Market

References

External links
 10th FIP World Polo Championship Chile 2015
 FIP Awards the FIP World Championship VIII – 2007 To Mexico

 
Polo competitions
Polo